The 1972 Scheldeprijs was the 59th edition of the Scheldeprijs cycle race and was held on 1 August 1972. The race was won by Eddy Merckx.

General classification

References

1972
1972 in road cycling
1972 in Belgian sport